Jamie Falcon was a Delegate candidate for the 33rd district of Maryland.

Biography
Libertarian leaning Conservative Republican candidate for Maryland's General Assembly for District 33 (Arnold, Broadneck, Crofton, Crownsville, Davidsonville, Gambrills, Millersville, Severna Park). Shortly after the election Falcon appeared in newspapers and on Virginia television for rescuing a choking baby.  In 2016, Falcon was selected as a Person to Watch

He is the married father of two children.

Political
Elected Alternate Delegate from Congressional District 1 to Republican National Convention (RNC) in 2008, [ winning most votes of any Republican Delegate, Alternate Delegate, or Congressional Candidate] (in Primary). Elected again in CD3, following redistricting, as Alternated Delegate to RNC 2012, [ winning most votes of Delegates or Alternates from CD3.] Other political activities included:

Maryland State-wide Volunteer Director, John McCain for President, 2008 
Campaign Chair, Ron George of Delegate, 2010.  Ron George won more votes than Maryland's Speaker of the House, Michael E. Busch.
Anne Arundel County Chair, Mitt Romney for President, 2012.
Member, Anne Arundel County Republican Central Committee.

As a candidate for Maryland's House of Delegates, District 33, Falcon was endorsed by the area newspaper, The Capital.

Following the 2014 race, Falcon was appointed by Governor Larry Hogan to Chair the Anne Arundel County School Board Nominating Commission (SBNC).  Falcon and several other Hogan appointees sued the State of Maryland and won a preliminary injunction over subsequent legislation removing them from office.  Governor Hogan had vetoed the legislation but the General Assembly overrode the veto.  The state appealed the court decision supporting Falcon and the state won on appeal.  The teachers union of the county filed suit against Falcon and Governor Hogan but their request was denied.  An elected school board for Anne Arundel County had been a long-term goal of the Republicans. Falcon's role with the SBNC induced the legislation that delivered an elected school board to Anne Arundel County.

Work
Adjunct faculty member, Economics, UMBC,
Sergeant, Ocean City Beach Patrol, Member of the Anne Arundel County Pension Oversight Commission

Former work
Chairman, Anne Arundel County School Board Nominating Commission,
Annapolis City Mayor's Economic Transition Team,
Anne Arundel County Executive's Economic Transition Team, Anne Arundel County Executive's Commission on Excellence, Economics, Anne Arundel Community College (AACC), Math teacher, Anne Arundel County Public Schools (AACPS), Math teacher, Cecil County Public Schools (CCPS), Business development, Southeast Corporate FCU

Military
U.S. Navy, Quartermaster (QM3) and Rescue Swimmer.
Three letters of achievement and one letter of commendation.

Education
A.A. Business Administration, Cecil Community College
B.S. Finance, University of Maryland College Park
M.A. Economics, University of Delaware
Ph.D. Public Policy, UMBC
Coursework at Salisbury University and University of Maryland University College, Schwäbisch Gmund, Germany
Ph.D. dissertation topic: Evaluating Near Shore Spinal Injuries and Alternatives to Reduce their Occurrence

References

http://www.capitalgazette.com/news/election/falcon-seeks-district-house-seat/article_084d5c89-eb39-5d85-8369-77c469573b1d.html
https://web.archive.org/web/20140129192318/http://www.blogtalkradio.com/redmaryland/2014/01/19/red-maryland-election-focus-1-18-14

External links
Campaign website:  www.jamiefalcon.com
Twitter: 
Facebook: 
LinkedIn: 
Quora: 

Living people
Maryland Republicans
University of Delaware alumni
University of Maryland, Baltimore County alumni
University of Maryland, College Park alumni
Year of birth missing (living people)